Hecelchakán  is one of the 11 municipalities in the Mexican state of Campeche. The municipal seat, and largest settlement, is the city of Hecelchakán.

The municipality had a 2005 census population of 28,306, with 10,285 in the municipal seat. The municipality covers an area of 1,331.99 km² (514.284 sq mi) and includes numerous smaller outlying communities, the largest of which is the town of Pomuch.

The name comes from the Maya words helel (savanna) and chakan (rest).

Location
Hecelchakán borders to the north with Calkiní Municipality, to the south with Tenabo Municipality, to the east with Yucatán State and Hopelchén Municipality, and to the west with the Gulf of Mexico, with 24 km of shoreline.

It is at an average altitude of 10 m above sea level.

Demographics
As of 2010, the municipality had a total population of 28,306.

As of 2010, the city of Hecelchakán had a population of 10,285. Other than the city of Hecelchakán, the municipality had 80 localities, the largest of which (with 2010 populations in parentheses) were: Pomuch (8,694), classified as urban, and Pocboc (1,624), Cumpich (1,587), Campo Menonita Yalnón (1,151), and Santa Cruz (1,118), classified as rural.

History
On 7 December 1915, when decree no. 51 approved a new law of interior administration, Hecelchakán became one of the eight free municipalities of the new state of Campeche.  That law came into effect on 1 January 1916.

References

 Link to tables of population data from Census of 2005 INEGI: Instituto Nacional de Estadística, Geografía e Informática
 Enciclopedia de los Municipios de México: Encyclopedia of  Mexican Municipalities (in Spanish)

External links
Ayuntamiento de Hecelchakán Official website

Municipalities of Campeche